The 1980 United States presidential election in Utah took place on November 4, 1980. All 50 states and the District of Columbia, were part of the 1980 United States presidential election. State voters chose four electors to the Electoral College, which selected the president and vice president of the United States.

Utah was won by former Governor of California Ronald Reagan, the Republican nominee, who was running against incumbent President and former Governor of Georgia Jimmy Carter, the Democratic nominee. Reagan ran with former C.I.A. Director George H. W. Bush of Texas, and Carter ran with Walter Mondale, incumbent vice president and former senator from Minnesota. Reagan won the election nationally by a landslide.

Utah weighed in as the most Republican state in the nation in this election, and Reagan’s win remains the most recent occurrence in which a presidential candidate carried a state by more than 50 percentage points, whilst Carter's share of the popular vote remains the worst ever by a Democrat in the Beehive State. Reagan won Carbon County by a mere three votes, but comfortably beat Carter, who was widely criticized for his inability to understand issues specific to the West (especially water development) everywhere else. Carter’s next best county was Tooele where Reagan obtained 62 percent of the vote; Reagan surpassed three-quarters of the vote in seventeen of twenty-nine counties.

Liberal Republican John B. Anderson ran as a third-party candidate with some success in the Northeast, Western Washington and some college towns; however in conservative, Mormon Utah, Anderson possessed little appeal and could not exceed 9.4 percent of the vote in any county, polling merely three votes in Piute County and only 1.4 percent in Wayne County.

Results

Results by county

See also
 United States presidential elections in Utah
 Iran–Contra affair
 Nicaragua guerrilla war
 Presidency of Ronald Reagan

References

Utah
1980
1980 Utah elections